The Crookwell River is a perennial river that is part of the Lachlan catchment within the Murray–Darling basin, located in the Southern Tablelands and South West Slopes regions of New South Wales, Australia.

The river descends  over its  course.

Etymology 
The river was originally named "Crook-ell" by William Stephenson, who originated from Crookhall, Durham, England.

Native fish fauna
Large Murray cod and endangered Macquarie perch, amongst other native fish, once abounded in the Crookwell, virtually to the base of Crookwell township:

See also

 
 Rivers of New South Wales

References

Tributaries of the Lachlan River
Rivers of New South Wales